Ibrahima Diakité (born August 5, 1994), better known by his stage name Gazo, is a French rapper  of  Guinean descent.

Gazo is from a suburb of Paris called Saint-Denis. It is often named in many of his songs and also often identified as the "93" based on the French INSEE code for the region. In his youth, he got involved with a lot of troublemaking. His parents kicked him out by age 12, and by age 15 he left school, deciding to embark on his rap career along with some of his friends in Saint-Denis, eventually leading him to join the Gangster Disciple Nation (GDN) around the age of 16 with his friends. Putting a number of songs on YouTube, he got the attention of Gims who offered a joint track to him on his own album Le Fléau. Gazo released his own mixtape Drill FR on 26 February 2021. It reached number 1 on the French Albums Chart with the single "Haine&Sex" reaching number 2 on the French Single Chart. 

Gazo has had much success in his rap career since. "Haine&Sex" has since received diamond certification.  He is commonly known as "The Prince of French Drill". Per one of his producers, Flem KGB, as well as a general consensus among fans of French rap, Gazo created an identifiable brand for French drill music, taking influence from UK and US drill yet unique on its own.

Discography

Studio albums

Mixtapes

Singles

*Did not appear in the official Belgian Ultratop 50 charts, but rather in the bubbling under Ultratip charts.

Featured in

*Did not appear in the official Belgian Ultratop 50 charts, but rather in the bubbling under Ultratip charts.

Other charting songs

References

French rappers
1994 births
Living people
French people of Guinean descent
People from Île-de-France